Mimotroea cacioides is a species of longhorn beetle in the subfamily Lamiinae, and the only species in the genus Mimotroea. It was described by Breuning in 1939. It is endemic to New Guinea.

It's 7.5 mm long and 2.25 mm wide, and its type locality is Kokoda, Papua New Guinea

References

Desmiphorini
Beetles described in 1939
Taxa named by Stephan von Breuning (entomologist)
Monotypic beetle genera
Endemic fauna of New Guinea